1931 in sports describes the year's events in world sport.

Alpine skiing
FIS Alpine World Ski Championships

Inaugural FIS Alpine World Ski Championships are held at Mürren, Switzerland.  The events are a downhill and a slalom race in both the men's and women's categories.  The winners are:
 Men's Downhill – Walter Prager (Switzerland)
 Men's Slalom – David Zogg (Switzerland)
 Women's Downhill – Esme Mackinnon (Great Britain)
 Women's Slalom – Esme Mackinnon (Great Britain)

American football
 NFL championship – Green Bay Packers (12–2)
 Rose Bowl (1930 season):
 The Alabama Crimson Tide won 24–0 over the Washington State Cougars to share the college football national championship

Association football
England
 The Football League – Arsenal 66 points, Aston Villa 59, Sheffield Wednesday 52, Portsmouth 49, Huddersfield Town 48, Derby County 46
 FA Cup final – West Bromwich Albion 2–1 Birmingham City at Empire Stadium, Wembley, London
Germany
 National Championship – Hertha BSC 3–2 TSV 1860 München at Köln
Spain
 La Liga won by Athletic Bilbao
Italy
 Serie A won by Juventus
Brazil
 Foundation of Botafogo Rio

Athletics
 29 – 31 Maj - Olympics of Grace, Florence Italy

Australian rules football
 May 9: Richmond beat South Melbourne’s 12 year record for the highest score when they kick 30.19 (199) to North Melbourne’s 4.7 (31). Doug Strang, in his second game, and Jack Titus kick 22 goals between them – still an equal record for two players on one side.
VFL Premiership
 Geelong wins the 35th VFL Premiership: defeating Richmond 9.14 (68) to 7.6 (48) at Melbourne Cricket Ground (MCG)
 The annual Brownlow Medal is awarded to Haydn Bunton senior (Fitzroy)
South Australian National Football League
 3 October: North Adelaide 17.13 (115) defeat Sturt 11.11 (77) to win their sixth SANFL premiership.
 Magarey Medal won by Jack Sexton (West Adelaide)
Western Australian National Football League
 1 June: East Fremantle’s 4.28 (52) against South Fremantle’s 5.8 (38) is the second most inaccurate score in WA(N)FL history by excess of behinds over goals and the most until 1957.
 17 October: East Fremantle win their fourth consecutive WA(N)FL premiership, beating Subiaco 9.13 (67) to 7.7 (49) in the 1931 WANFL Grand Final.
 Sandover Medal won by Lin Richards (East Fremantle)

Bandy
Sweden
 Championship final – AIK 4–3 IF Karlstad-Göta

Baseball
World Series
 1–10 October — St. Louis Cardinals (NL) defeats Philadelphia Athletics (AL) to win the 1931 World Series by four games to three
Major League Baseball
 MVP awards to Frankie Frisch (NL) and Lefty Grove (AL) 
Negro leagues
 The Negro National League disbands.  St. Louis Stars win the last championship.

Basketball
ABL Championship

Brooklyn Visitations win four games to two over the Fort Wayne Hoosiers

College Championship
 Northwestern University wins the men's college basketball title

Events
The ABL suspends operations after the 1930–1931 season.  This is also the last year it operates as a major professional league.

Bobsleigh
Bobsleigh World Championships
 2nd FIBT World Championships 1931 are held in Oberhof, Germany (two-man bob) and St Moritz, Switzerland (four-man bob).  Both gold medals are won by Germany.

Boxing
Events
 World Middleweight Champion Mickey Walker vacates his title to campaign as a heavyweight.  The middleweight championship remains vacant until 1941.
Lineal world champions
 World Heavyweight Championship – Max Schmeling
 World Light Heavyweight Championship – Maxie Rosenbloom
 World Middleweight Championship – Mickey Walker → vacant
 World Welterweight Championship – Tommy Freeman → "Young" Jack Thompson → Lou Brouillard
 World Lightweight Championship – Tony Canzoneri
 World Featherweight Championship – Bat Battalino
 World Bantamweight Championship – Panama Al Brown
 World Flyweight Championship – vacant

Canadian football
Grey Cup
 19th Grey Cup in the Canadian Football League – Montreal AAA defeats Regina Roughriders 22–0

Cricket
Events
 New Zealand plays its first Test series in England.  England wins the series 1–0 with two matches drawn.
England
 County Championship – Yorkshire
 Minor Counties Championship – Leicestershire II
 Most runs – Herbert Sutcliffe 3006 @ 96.96 (HS 230)
 Most wickets – Tich Freeman 276 @ 15.60 (BB 10–79)  
 Wisden Cricketers of the Year – Bill Bowes, Stewie Dempster, James Langridge, Iftikhar Ali Khan Pataudi, Hedley Verity 
Australia
 Sheffield Shield – Victoria
 Most runs – Don Bradman 1422 @ 79.00 (HS 258) 
 Most wickets – Clarrie Grimmett 74 @ 19.14 (BB 7–87)  
India
 Bombay Quadrangular – not contested
New Zealand
 Plunket Shield – Canterbury
South Africa
 Currie Cup – not contested
West Indies
 Inter-Colonial Tournament – not contested

Cycling
Tour de France
 Antonin Magne (France) wins the 25th Tour de France
Other events
 Giro d'Italia is won by Francesco Camusso (Italy)
 World Cycling Championship is won by Learco Guerra (Italy)

Figure skating
World Figure Skating Championships
 World Men's Champion – Karl Schäfer (Austria)
 World Women's Champion – Sonja Henie (Norway)
 World Pairs Champions – Emília Rotter and László Szollás (Hungary)

Golf
Major tournaments
 British Open – Tommy Armour
 U.S. Open – Billy Burke
 PGA Championship – Tom Creavy
Other tournaments
 British Amateur – Eric Martin-Smith
 U.S. Amateur – Francis Ouimet
 Women's Western Open – June Beebe

Harness racing
USA
 Hambletonian – Calumet Butler
 Kentucky Futurity – The Protector

Horse racing
England
 Champion Hurdle – not contested due to frost
 Cheltenham Gold Cup – not contested due to frost
 Grand National – Grakle
 1,000 Guineas Stakes – Four Course
 2,000 Guineas Stakes – Cameronian
 The Derby – Cameronian
 The Oaks – Brulette
 St. Leger Stakes – Sandwich
Australia
 Melbourne Cup – White Nose
Canada
 King's Plate – Froth Blower
France
 Prix de l'Arc de Triomphe – Pearl Cap
Ireland
 Irish Grand National – Impudent Barney
 Irish Derby Stakes – Sea Serpent 
USA
 Kentucky Derby – Twenty Grand
 Preakness Stakes – Mate
 Belmont Stakes – Twenty Grand

Ice hockey
Stanley Cup
 Montreal Canadiens defeats Chicago Black Hawks by 3 games to 2
Ice Hockey World Championships
 Gold Medal – Canada
 Silver Medal – United States
 Bronze Medal – Austria
Other events
 Hockey Night in Canada, now the oldest sports-related television program still on air, debuts as a radio program known as the General Motors Hockey Broadcast. The TV series begins in 1952.

Motorsport

Nordic skiing
FIS Nordic World Ski Championships
 6th FIS Nordic World Ski Championships 1931 are held at Oberhof, Germany

Rowing
The Boat Race
 21 March — Cambridge wins the 83rd Oxford and Cambridge Boat Race

Rugby league
England
 Championship – Swinton
 Challenge Cup final – Halifax 22–8 York at Empire Stadium, Wembley, London
 Lancashire League Championship – Swinton
 Yorkshire League Championship – Leeds
 Lancashire County Cup – St Helens Recs 18–3 Wigan
 Yorkshire County Cup – Leeds 10–2 Huddersfield 
Australia
 NSW Premiership – South Sydney 12–7 Eastern Suburbs

Rugby union
Five Nations Championship
 44th Five Nations Championship series is won by Wales
 Shortly after the 1931 Five Nations Championship is completed, France is banned from the competition due to allegations of professionalism and administrative deficiencies. France will be readmitted after the 1939 competition but will not be able to play until 1947 because of the suspension of international rugby during World War II.  In the meantime, the competition reverts to its original title of Home Nations Championship.

Snooker
World Championship
 5th World Snooker Championship is won by Joe Davis who defeats Tom Dennis 25–21

Speed skating
Speed Skating World Championships
 Men's All-round Champion – Clas Thunberg (Finland)

Tennis

Australia
 Australian Men's Singles Championship – Jack Crawford (Australia) defeats Harry Hopman (Australia) 6–4 6–2 2–6 6–1 
 Australian Women's Singles Championship – Coral Buttsworth (Australia) defeats Marjorie Cox Crawford (Australia) 1–6 6–3 6–4 
England
 Wimbledon Men's Singles Championship – Sidney Wood (USA) by a walkover after Frank Shields (USA) withdraws from the final due to an ankle injury 
 Wimbledon Women's Singles Championship – Cilly Aussem (Germany) defeats Hilde Krahwinkel Sperling (Germany) 6–2 7–5 
France
 French Men's Singles Championship – Jean Borotra (France) defeats Christian Boussus (USA) 2–6 6–4 7–5 6–4 
 French Women's Singles Championship – Cilly Aussem (Germany) defeats Betty Nuthall (Great Britain) 8–6 6–1 
USA
 American Men's Singles Championship – Ellsworth Vines (USA) defeats George Lott (USA) 7–9 6–3 9–7 7–5 
 American Women's Singles Championship – Helen Wills Moody (USA) defeats Eileen Bennett Whittingstall (Great Britain) 6–4 6–1 
Davis Cup
 1931 International Lawn Tennis Challenge –  3–2  at Stade Roland Garros (clay) Paris, France

Awards
Associated Press Athlete of the Year
 Inauguration of the Athlete of the Year award in the United States by the Associated Press (AP).  The AP offers a male and a female athlete of the year award to either a professional or amateur athlete, the awards being voted on annually by a panel of AP sports editors from across the United States.  The first winners are:
 Associated Press Male Athlete of the Year – Pepper Martin (baseball)
 Associated Press Female Athlete of the Year – Helene Madison (swimming)

References

 
Sports by year